The 2014 NWSL Expansion Draft was a special draft held on January 10 by the National Women's Soccer League to allow the expansion side Houston Dash to select players.  The Dash were allowed to select ten players from the existing eight NWSL teams.

Format
2013 playoff teams may protect up to 9 players, and 2013 non-playoff teams up to 10.
Clubs with more than two US allocated players must leave at least one unprotected.
The Dash are allowed to pick up to two players from any existing team, though choosing a US allocated player is considered as using both picks.
The Dash are allowed to pick no more than two US allocated players, one Canadian allocated player, and one Mexican allocated player.
When an existing club loses a player, they may protect one of their remaining unprotected players.
Existing clubs are required to protect players that are...
On loan from another league
A non-allocated international player
Contractually limited against potential movement between teams

Expansion draft results

Team-by-team breakdown
Bold indicates a player was selected in the expansion draft
Italic indicates a player whose rights are owned but is not under contract
Blue, green, and red highlights indicate US, Mexican, and Canadian allocated players
Yellow highlight indicates non-allocated international players or players on loan from another league
^Indicates a player that was protected after a teammate had been drafted

Boston Breakers

Chicago Red Stars

FC Kansas City

Portland Thorns FC

Seattle Reign FC

Sky Blue FC

Washington Spirit

Western New York Flash

References

Official draft format release
Equalizer list of protected and unprotected players
NWSLNews draft summary

See also
List of NWSL drafts
2014 NWSL season

National Women's Soccer League drafts
2014 National Women's Soccer League season
Houston Dash
NWSL Expansion Draft